Shambhupura Union is a union, which is the smallest administrative body of Bangladesh, located in Sonargaon Upazila, Narayanganj District, Bangladesh. The total population is 24,313.

References

Unions of Sonargaon Upazila